Nos Festa is an album recorded by Eddy Moreno.  The album was released in 1981.  It features the singles "Arriola" and "Grandeza".  "Grandeza" was recorded by his nephew Val Xalino.

"Nos Festa" means "Our Party" or "Our Holiday" in Portuguese and Capeverdean Creole.

Eddy Moreno was the first to record in the Sanjon style.  The composer was done by Djuta Silva.

The first track of the album titled "Arriola" which is the Creole name of "nonsense" became a hit.  It was written by Eddy Moreno in the 1950s, with the song it marked a new era in Cape Verde music with the first rap.

An album titled after the sixth track was released in 2001, it was recorded by his nephew and Djô d'Eloy.

Track listing

See also
Val Xalino
Grandeza (album)
Eddy Moreno

References

1981 albums